Stor-Sandskäret is a Swedish shoal belonging to the Piteå archipelago. Together with Sandskärsgrundet, the island is part of the Bondöfjärd Reserve.

In the south, the island Sandskärshörun is attached to the island.

References

Shoals of the Baltic Sea
Landforms of Norrbotten County